Ivor Evans (born 23 January 1966) is a Fijian former professional footballer who played as a midfielder.

Club career

Ivor Evans started his career in his hometown team Labasa F.C., and then he played for Fiji giants Ba F.C.
In 1987, he arrived in North America. Primarily he got a brief spell with MISL team St. Louis Steamers, but he didn't play any match.
Next he was selected by Vancouver 86ers in an open trial. He has been playing during his career for Vancouver 86ers, in Canadian Soccer League, in American Professional Soccer League and in the A-League from 1987 to 1997. He played 221 matches and scored 47 goal for Vancouver 86ers.

In 1991, he had a brief spell with Fijian side Nadi F.C. From 1995/1996 season, while playing for Vancouver 86ers in A-League, Ivor Evans started to play also for Richmond Rangers FC, an Indo-Canadian team of the Vancouver Metro Soccer League, an amateur league operating in British Columbia, primarily in the Lower Mainland area.

Afterwards Ivor Evans has played in FSLGV, a soccer league of the Fijian Community in Vancouver, for Tanoa and Bilolevu. In April 2008, 17, while playing for Bilolevu, he has been disqualified for 3 years until 2011.

Honors
Ivor was named twice in the CSL All-Star team in 1990 and in 1991, and once in APSL All-Star Team in 1993.

International career
He has represented the under-20 Fiji national football team in 1985 in the Oceania U-20 Youth Cup. He played 4 matches and scored twice, and he was sent-off in the fourth match against Taiwan.

In June 1985 he has played with the senior national team in three friendly matches against New Zealand.
Ivor played twice in the 1990 FIFA World Cup qualifiers in the knockout matches against Australia. Surprisingly Fiji won the home match 1–0, but lost the return match 5–1 (5–2 on aggregate) and didn't advance to the next round.

Career statistics

Bio
Ivor's son, whose name is also Ivor, was a youth player of Vancouver Whitecaps FC.

References

External links
 
 Ivor Evans – SoccerStats.us

Living people
Fijian footballers
Fiji international footballers
Fijian expatriate footballers
Expatriate soccer players in Canada
Canadian Soccer League (1987–1992) players
American Professional Soccer League players
Labasa F.C. players
Major Indoor Soccer League (1978–1992) players
St. Louis Steamers (original MISL) players
Vancouver Whitecaps (1986–2010) players
Association football midfielders
Ba F.C. players
Fijian expatriate sportspeople in Canada
Expatriate soccer players in the United States
Fijian expatriate sportspeople in the United States
1966 births
People from Labasa
Fijian people of Welsh descent
Nadi F.C. players